Hillwood Volcano is an extinct volcano located near Hillwood In Northern Tasmania Australia

Geology 
The Hillwood Volcano is a stratovolcano. The last eruption was 250 million years ago.

References 

Volcanoes of Tasmania
Inactive volcanoes